"Mal di stomaco" (Stomachache) is the second single released by Fabri Fibra from his third solo studio album: Tradimento, recorded in 2006.

As in many songs of the album, also in "Mal di Stomaco" the rapper raps about many negative aspects of Italy inserting references to various crime events.

Charts

References 

2006 singles
Fabri Fibra songs
Italian songs
2006 songs
Songs written by Fabri Fibra